Bunty Bubbly Ki Mummy is an Indian television series which aired on DD National. The series stars Benjamin Gilani and Grusha Kapoor in the main lead. It was directed by Bikramjeet Singh Bhullar and produced by Grusha Kapoor.

Synopsis

The story is centred on two families, one is of Suman's (Grusha Kapoor) and other her step mother. Suman's father left a piece of land without declaring any bequest before his death and the two families fight.

Cast

References 

2011 Indian television series debuts
DD National original programming
Indian drama television series